Spool knitting, corking, French knitting or tomboy knitting is a form of knitting that uses a spool with a number of nails or pegs around the rim to produce a tube or sheet of fabric. The spool knitting devices are called knitting spools, knitting nancys, knitting frame, or French knitters.

The technique is to wrap the yarn around all of the spool's pegs, twice. The lower loop of yarn is then lifted over the upper loop and off the peg, thereby creating stitches. The yarn is then wrapped around the entire loom, creating a new upper yarn on each peg. This process is repeated until the project is complete. 

Spool knitting frames typically have four or five pegs (or brass nails), although the number can range to more than 100.

Uses

Many things can be made from the resulting tube. For example, it can be wound in a spiral to produce a mat or rug or, if a larger spool with more nails is used, a sock or a hat could be made. Historically, spool knitting has been used to make horse reins.

Spool knitting is a traditional way to teach children the basic principles of knitting. According to Mary McCormack, author of Spool Knitting (published in 1909), "Few elementary exercises have aroused more interest in the child than the toy knitting; due, perhaps, to its simplicity and his power to do it easily and well."

History

Knitting spools are the oldest members of the knitting loom family, with a history dating back over 400 years. The earliest recorded reference to the use of a frame for knitting is in 1535 in Strasbourg in a legal decision about the proper guild for sock knitters. It has been speculated by some 3D printing hobbyists that the so-called Roman dodecahedra might have been used as glove knitting devices, dating to c. 1st–5th century CE, however, this hypothesis has little support from the academic community and is not supported by the available historical evidence. Lucets are essentially two-prong knitting frames.

Spools sold as "knitting nancys" sometimes had a figure painted or printed on them, thus resembling a wooden doll. Homemade knitting spools are sometimes made by placing a peg-like object, such as a nail, into a hard solid object, such as a block of wood (or a traditional wooden spool). 

Beginning in the latter half of the 20th century, various small looms (usually plastic) using the same peg-knitting technique as knitting spools have been made. Some are larger than knitting spools, and can knit larger items. Some are straight, and make flat items such as blankets or scarfs, and some are round for making socks, hats, or other similar items. If the thread is not wrapped around in a helix, but back-and-forth, leaving two pegs with a space between that no yarn crosses, a flat sheet can be made on a round frame.

Cranked versions
Simple versions contain just peg-like structures sticking up from a solid object. More complex ones operate complex mechanisms and automatically produce a knitted item with just a simple motion, such as a turn of a crank. See circular knitting#Spool and machine circular knitting for more on these machines.

See also
Circular knitting
I-cord is a similar, but not identical, knitting technique, done in knitting needles.
Finger knitting
Lucet

References

External links

 Corking how to
 Spool Knitting Tutorials & Projects
 Spool knitting
 , also downloadable at :File:Spool knitting (IA spoolknitting00mcco).pdf and :File:Spool knitting (IA spoolknitting00mccorich).pdf

Knitting